Penis Landscape, or Work 219: Landscape XX, is a painting by H. R. Giger. Created in 1973, airbrushed acrylic on paper-covered wood, it measures . It depicts a number of penises entering vaginas, arranged in an alternating pattern. One is wearing a condom. 

It came to a greater level of attention during the trial of vocalist Jello Biafra after his band the Dead Kennedys featured it as a poster included with their 1985 album Frankenchrist. The poster was printed and inserted in the Frankenchrist album with an additional sticker on the outside shrinkwrap, warning buyers of the contents. The resulting trial for obscenity nearly drove the Alternative Tentacles label into bankruptcy.

During the making of the Kiss video for "(You Make Me) Rock Hard" in 1988, when the production went in for close-ups, it was found that Gene Simmons had this painting laminated on the front of his bass guitar. Despite production's call over the radio for Band-Aids, none of Gene's close-up shots that included his bass guitar were acceptable for MTV. The Band-Aids can be seen in the music video in medium shots.

References

1973 paintings
H. R. Giger
Human penis
Vagina and vulva in art